The Sacred Rocks of Hunza  or Haldeikish are one of the earliest sites of Petroglyphs along the ancient silk route. It is a cultural heritage site in Gilgit-Baltistan, Pakistan. The carvings on the rocks dates back to the 1st Millennium AD.

The rock is situated on a top of a hill which lies in east to the Hunza River. The site is on the main Karakoram Highway (KKH) in between Ganish village and Attabad Lake. The rocks were once able to be approached by well-worn stone steps and contained a series of Buddhist cave shelters but with this mountainous areas extreme weather and the ravages of time they have fallen with only a few being preserved. The rocks are one of the major tourist attractions in Gilgit-Baltistan, Pakistan.

Location
The sacred rocks (Haldeikish)  are situated between the hunza river ands the Karakorum highway and a five minutes drive from the UNESCO enlisted village of Ganish. Near to the town of Karimabad in Hunza Valley. The rock is 180 metres in length and 9 metres at their highest point, the Sacred Rocks of Hunza consist of four main boulders with two stages/Portions of rock engravings and carvings. It is easily accessible from the Karakoram Highway which connects Pakistan with China. It is an isolated rock which is further divided into two portions.

Haldeikish 
The name Haldeikish translates to ‘a place of many male Ibex’, with engravings of Ibex scattered along the rock faces, a message to all travellers that wild Ibex were plentiful in this area.

Haldeikish has thousands of petroglyphs in Bactrian , Sogdian, Kharoshti, Tibetan, Chinese and Brahmi written by the Silk Routes  'many' travellers. These petroglyphs show the diverse cultural exchange that once passed through the Hunza region and help us to understand the history of this entire region from the first millennium CE.

Specifications
The Sacred Rock is divided into two portions, an upper portion and a lower one. Both the portions carry carvings on them which are basically inscriptions and images from Pre-Historic era. There used to be many Buddhist shelter caves in ancient times which later collapsed or fell over the time only some being preserved.

Upper Portion
The upper portion of the rock consist of inscriptions which are carved in Sogdian, Kharosthi, Brahmi, Sarada and Proto Sarada languages. The  names of the Emperors of the Kushan Empire Kanishka and Huvishka appear in these inscriptions. The name of the Trukha King Ramadusa is also mentioned in inscriptions which are carved in the Brahmi script.

Lower Portion
The lower portion is engraved by the images of Ibexes. These ibexes are shown in different situations, including being hunted. The carvings also contain Horned-Human deities playing with the ibexes. The carvings of the Ibexes are a proof of the ibex being an animal which holds cultural importance to Buddhists as well as to the region in ancient times. One of the carvings also shows the image of an ancient Chinese King. Some carvings show a Tibetan styled Stupa.

Inscription mentioning Chandragupta II 
The inscription mentioning Chandragupta II of Gupta empire reads ''Chandra Sri Vikramaditya conquers’' with a date corresponding to 419 AD. If Chandra is identified with Chandragupta, it appears that Chandragupta marched through the Punjab region, and advanced up to the country of the Vahlikas, that is, Balkh in present-day Afghanistan. The Sanskrit inscriptions at the Sacred Rock of Hunza, written in Gupta script, mention the name Chandra. A few of these inscriptions also mention the name Harishena, and one particular inscription mentions Chandra with the epithet "Vikramaditya". Based on the identification of "Chandra" with Chandragupta, and Harishena with the Gupta courtier Harishena, these inscriptions can be considered as further evidence of a Gupta military campaign in the area. However, this identification is not certain, and Chandra of the Hunza inscriptions could have well been a local ruler.

Preservation
The Sacred Rock of Hunza is a Cultural Heritage Site of Pakistan and is currently well preserved but still some the carvings carrying inscriptions are effected due to aging. There were many Buddhist shelter caves which fell over time and only few being preserved. Commissioner of Northern Areas of Pakistan and Director of Archaeology are responsible for the preservation of the site, both acting under the Government of Pakistan. Due to recent flooding in Hunza River the site faces extreme danger in future.

See also 

List of forts in Pakistan
List of museums in Pakistan

References

Bibliography 

 
 

Archaeological sites in Gilgit-Baltistan
History of Gilgit-Baltistan
Tourist attractions in Gilgit-Baltistan
Sacred rocks